Mosque of As-Saqiya is a mosque located in Medina, Saudi Arabia inside the current Anbariya train station. The mosque was built on the dome of the Islamic Prophet Muhammad when he went out for the Battle of Badr, and this is considered to be the place where  verse Quran 8:7 was descended. There are accounts in Hadith of the prophet performing ablution with the water of Suqya well located near here before he sets out for the battle, and the water from the well was also drawn to drink. It is also being told that Umar lead the Istiqlaa prayer (prayer for rain) here by the request of Abbas bin Abdul Muttalib.

Etymology 
The mosque was named after the well of Suqya, owned by Sa`d ibn Abi Waqqas, located in the south.

Architecture 
This small mosque has three domes, and it is 56 meters square meters wide. It has elements of Umayyad architecture style, and it was restored at the time of the king Fahd bin Abdul Aziz rule.

See also
 List of mosques in Saudi Arabia
  Lists of mosques 
 List of mosques in Medina

References 

Mosques in Medina